La mujer del Vendaval (English title: The Lady from Vendaval) is a Mexican telenovela produced by Mapat L. de Zatarain for Televisa. It is a remake of the Venezuelan telenovela Un esposo para Estela. On November 12, 2012, Canal de las Estrellas started broadcasting La Mujer Del Vendaval weekdays at 6:15pm, replacing Cachito de cielo. The last episode was broadcast on June 30, 2013, with De que te quiero, te quiero replacing it the following day.

Ariadne Díaz and José Ron star as the main protagonists, while Chantal Andere, Marco Muñoz, Manuel "Flaco" Ibáñez, Florencia del Saracho, and Javier Jattin star as the main antagonists.

Production of La Mujer Del Vendaval officially started on August 16, 2012. In the United States, Univision aired La Mujer Del Vendaval from August 19, 2013 to April 4, 2014.

Plot
Marcela Morales is about to get the inheritance her mother left her. As a condition to receive it, her mother established she should be married. Such legacy is Marcela´s last hope for saving the ranch which is mortgaged. For this matter, she puts an ad in the paper looking for a husband to be. Alessandro Casteló, one of the applicants, is rich, and the vice-president and heir to the important hotel chain, Toscana.

Hiding behind masks, Marcela and Alessandro meet at the beach. On the night of their encounter, a valuable family´s necklace disappears from Alessandro´s home, making Marcela the main suspect of such robbery.

In order to recover the necklace, Alessandro shows up at the ranch as Marcela´s husband to be. Nevertheless, the intense passion he feels for her and getting to know her, change his original goal making him want to prove her innocence and win her love for real. For that purpose, he will have to overcome a series of obstacles that prevent their love from coming true.

Cast
Confirmed as of August 16, 2012.

Main

Ariadne Díaz as Marcela Morales de Casteló
José Ron as Alessandro Casteló Berrocal
Chantal Andere as Octavia Cotilla Vda. de Hernández
Alfredo Adame as Luciano Casteló
María Marcela as Silvana Berrocal de Casteló
Manuel "Flaco" Ibáñez as Timoteo Quiñónez
Agustín Arana as Emiliano Ferreira Preciado
Florencia de Saracho as María Laura Morales Aldama
Michelle Renaud as Alba María Morales Aldama
Patricio Borghetti as Cristian Serratos
Javier Jattin as Camilo Preciado

Also main

Odiseo Bichir as Mateo Reyna
Magda Karina as Sagrario Aldama
Thelma Madrigal as Nisa Casteló Berrocal
Lourdes Reyes as Ilse Sánchez
Rossana San Juan as Valeria Ferreira Preciado
Francisco Rubio as Amadeo Rosado Sánchez
Jauma Mateu as Mauro Urquiza
Jorge Ortín as Eulogio Ladrón
Sachi Tamashiro as July Barbosa
Mariana Karr as Conchita Pimentel
Mauricio Martínez as Mike Cisneros
Zoraida Gómez as Nuria Arévalos Andrade de Serratos
Jorge Gallegos as Lencho Quiñónez
José Carlos Farrera as Román Rosado Sánchez
Marco Muñoz as Severo Morales Iturbide

Special participation

Polo Monárrez as José Manuel "Cuchi"
Chao as Néstor de la Rosa
Juan Carlos Nava as Cirilo "Gordo" Barrios
Óscar Ferretti as Leonel
Anahí Fraser as Norma Martinez
Jorge van Rankin as Antonio Figueres
Eugenio Bartilotti as Giocondo de la Fuente
Mónica Zorti as Rosa Cruz
Iliana de la Garza as Penélope
Fernanda López as Inés Bernal
Lucía Zerecero as Linda 
Carla Cardona as Damiana Hernández Cotilla

References

External links 

Mexican telenovelas
Televisa telenovelas
2012 telenovelas
2012 Mexican television series debuts
2013 Mexican television series endings
Mexican television series based on Venezuelan television series
Spanish-language telenovelas